Ephraim Kirby-Smith (August 30, 1884 – July 8, 1938) was a college football player.

Early years
Kirby-Smith was born on August 30, 1884 in Sewanee, Tennessee, the son of American Civil War general Edmund Kirby Smith and his wife Cassie Selden. Edmund Kirby Smith's brother Ephraim, for whom his son was presumably named, died in 1847 from wounds suffered at the Battle of Molino del Rey.

College football
Kirby-Smith was a lineman for the college football team of the Sewanee Tigers, selected to its all-time football team.  He was selected All-Southern  in 1903 and 1904. At Sewanee he was a member of Phi Delta Theta.

References

1884 births
1938 deaths
American football tackles
American football guards
Sewanee Tigers football players
All-Southern college football players
People from Sewanee, Tennessee
Players of American football from Tennessee